Inventiones Mathematicae is a mathematical journal published monthly by Springer Science+Business Media. It was established in 1966 and is regarded as one of the most prestigious mathematics journals in the world. The current managing editors are Camillo De Lellis (Institute for Advanced Study, Princeton) and Jean-Benoît Bost (University of Paris-Sud).

Abstracting and indexing 
The journal is abstracted and indexed in:

References

External links

Mathematics journals
Publications established in 1966
English-language journals
Springer Science+Business Media academic journals
Monthly journals